is a railway station on the Takayama Main Line in the city of Gifu, Gifu Prefecture, Japan, operated by Central Japan Railway Company (JR Central). Along with Gifu Station and Nishi-Gifu Station, it is one of the three JR Central stations in the city of Gifu.

Lines

Station layout
Nagamori Station has two opposed ground-level side platforms connected by a footbridge. The station is unattended.

Platforms

Adjacent stations

History
Nagamori Station opened on November 1, 1920. The station was absorbed into the JR Central network upon the privatization of Japanese National Railways (JNR) on April 1, 1987.

Passenger statistics
In fiscal 2015, the station was used by an average of 643 passengers daily (boarding passengers only).

Surrounding area
Gifu General Medical Centre
 Tejikara Station (Meitetsu Kakamigahara Line)

See also
 List of Railway Stations in Japan

References

Railway stations in Gifu Prefecture
Takayama Main Line
Railway stations in Japan opened in 1920
Stations of Central Japan Railway Company